Fanous or Fanoos (pl.  ), also widely known as Fanous Ramadan, is an Egyptian folk and traditional lantern used to decorate streets and homes in the month of Ramadan. With their origins in Egypt, they have since spread across the Muslim world and are a common symbol associated with the holy month.

Etymology
The word "Fanous" (Fanos, Phanous and Fanoos in Egyptian dialects) is a term originating from Greek φανός, phanós. It means 'light' or 'lantern'. It was historically used in its meaning of "the light of the world," and is a symbol of hope, as in "light in the darkness".

History

The traditional use of fanous as decorations associated with Ramadan is believed to have originated during the Fatimid Caliphate, primarily centered in Egypt, where tradition holds that the Caliph Muizz was greeted and welcomed by the Egyptian people holding lanterns in masses to celebrate his arrival at Cairo during the holy month of Ramadan, as it was ancient tradition in Egypt to celebrate by lighting the streets with fanous lanterns. Its use has now spread to many Muslim countries.

In Ancient times it was similar to a lamp, and would have incorporated either candles or oil.  The fanous originally developed from the torches used in the Pharaonic festivals celebrating the rising of the star Sirius.  For five days, the Ancient Egyptians celebrated the birthdays of Osiris, Horus, Isis, Seth and Nephtys—one on each day—by lighting the streets with the fanous (torches). Torches or candles were also used in early Christianity.  This is recorded by Egyptian historian Al-Maqrizi (1364 - 1442), who noted in his book, "Al Mawaiz wa al-'i'tibar bi dhikr al-khitat wa al-'athar", that these torches or candles were used at Christmastime for celebration.

Today
Fanous is widely used all over the world – especially in Asian regions and the Arab world – not just for a specific religion purposes, but for names of people or decorative purposes. They can be found in houses, restaurants, hotels, malls, etc. Often arranged as a grouping of lights arranged in different designs and shapes. Metal and glass are mostly used for their construction.

References

Types of lamp
Ramadan
Egyptian culture
Ancient Egypt